The Carpentarian dunnart (Sminthopsis butleri) also known as Butler's dunnart is a marsupial with a puffy brown or mouse grey colour above and the underside of white, similar to its close relative the Kakadu dunnart. Head to anus length is 75-88mm with a tail of 72-90mm long for a total length of 147-178mm. Weight varies from 10-20g depending on a variety of factors including sex, food abundance, habitat etc.

Distribution and habitat 
Found in the Northern Kimberley's near Kalumburu in Western Australia and Bathurst and Melville Island in the Northern Territory. Habitat consists of eucalyptus and melaleuca forest with sandy soils up to and including 20 km from the coast. Also present on the island of New Guinea. In New Guinea found in grasslands and savannah in west of the island.

Social organisation and breeding
May breed in the dry season but needs more study.

Diet
No information, but most likely insects and small vertebrates.

References

External links
Australian Biological Resources Study
Australianfauna.com
National Multi-species Recovery Plan for the Carpentarian Antechinus
Recovery plan
Threatened species of the Northern Territory

Dasyuromorphs
Marsupials of New Guinea
Mammals of Western Australia
Mammals of the Northern Territory
Marsupials of Australia
Mammals described in 1979